The Pelican was a named train of the Southern Railway which ran from New York City to New Orleans and back until 1970.

Operations
The Pelican (train #41) departed New York's Pennsylvania Station going south via the Pennsylvania Railroad to Washington, D.C., then on Southern's line to Lynchburg, Virginia, then to Bristol, Virginia via the Norfolk and Western Railway with a major stop in Roanoke, Virginia and several stops toward Bristol. From Bristol to New Orleans, the Pelican ran on Southern's line with major station stops in Knoxville, Tennessee, Chattanooga, Tennessee, Birmingham, Alabama, and Meridian, Mississippi. South of Birmingham it made more local stops than other Southern Railway trains on the Birmingham-New Orleans route, such as the Southerner.

Train #42, the northbound Pelican, reversed the route.

In 1957, the Pelican carried:
A New York to New Orleans 10-roomette-6-double-bedroom sleeping car;
A New York to Knoxville 10-roomette-6-double-bedroom car;
A Washington to Shreveport 8-section-5-double-bedroom car (handled by Illinois Central Railroad's Southwestern Limited between Meridian and Shreveport);
A New York to Knoxville 10-roomette-6-double-bedroom car;
A New York to Bristol 10-roomette-6-double-bedroom car;
A Washington to Williamson 10-roomette-6-double-bedroom car (handled by Norfolk and Western Railway's Cavalier between Roanoke and Williamson);
A Petersburg to Bristol 10-section-1-compartment-2-double-bedroom car (handled by Norfolk and Western Railway's Cavalier between Petersburg and Roanoke);
A Roanoke to Birmingham dining car;
Washington to New Orleans coaches.

Into the 1950s, the train carried through sleeping cars which would split from the main route at Meridian and continue on the Illinois Central Railroad's Southwestern Limited into central Mississippi and central Louisiana to Shreveport, Louisiana. Timetables referred to section, compartment, and drawing room accommodations carrying from New York to Shreveport

History
O. Winston Link recorded the eastbound Pelican arriving in Rural Retreat, VA December 24, 1957. The recording is noted as being one of the last recordings of a Norfolk and Western Class J locomotive as well as the chimes from the nearby church. The actual details are all steam power was discontinued on the Bristol Line (Radford, VA to Bristol, VA) after December 31, 1957.  The Class J locomotives continued in passenger service on other divisions until April 1959.

 Please note the source No. 6 credited below is incorrect. The Birmingham Special and the now unnamed Pelican (Trains 11 and 12) still ran as separate trains up to the discontinuance of Nos. 11 and 12 on August 2, 1970. Source: Public Timetables of the Norfolk and Western Railway, issued February 25, 1970 and August 11, 1970.

With passenger traffic declining, the Pelican was combined with the Birmingham Special in 1970.

References

Named passenger trains of the United States
Passenger trains of the Southern Railway (U.S.)
Passenger trains of the Norfolk and Western Railway
Night trains of the United States
Passenger rail transportation in Alabama
Passenger rail transportation in Delaware
Passenger rail transportation in Maryland
Passenger rail transportation in Louisiana
Passenger rail transportation in Mississippi
Passenger rail transportation in New Jersey
Passenger rail transportation in New York (state)
Passenger rail transportation in Tennessee
Passenger rail transportation in Virginia
Passenger rail transportation in Pennsylvania
Railway services discontinued in 1970